Schönbühl SBB railway station is a railway station in the municipality of Urtenen-Schönbühl, in the Swiss canton of Bern. It is an intermediate stop on the standard gauge Olten–Bern line of Swiss Federal Railways.

Services 
The following services stop at Schönbühl SBB:

References

External links 
 
 

Railway stations in the canton of Bern
Swiss Federal Railways stations